The Dawson Stags were a minor league baseball team based in Dawson, New Mexico in 1912. Dawson briefly played in the 1912 season as members of the Class D level Rocky Mountain League. The Dawson team began play when the Colorado Springs Millionaires relocated during the season. Dawson, New Mexico did not host another minor league team and is a ghost town today.

History
The 1912 Dawson Stags became members of the four–team Class D level Rocky Mountain League during the season. The league started the season with the Cañon City Swastikas, Colorado Springs Millionaires,  La Junta Railroaders and Pueblo Indians beginning Rocky Mountain League play. During the season, Colorado Springs relocated to Dawson.

On June 15, 1912, the Colorado Springs Millionaires franchise relocated to Dawson, New Mexico.

The "Stags" moniker corresponds directly to the local mining industry. The mines in Dawson were numbered and referred to as Stag Canyon Mine. Stag Canyon Mine No. 2 and Stag Canyon Mine No. 1 suffered major explosions in 1913 and 1923, killing hundreds of mine workers.

Before the end of the 1912 season, the Rocky Mountain League permanently folded on July 5, 1912. The Colorado Springs/Dawson team was in 3rd place with a 11–20 overall record when the league stopped play. Playing under manager Harry Brammell, Colorado Springs/Dawson finished 12.5 games behind the 1st place Pueblo/Cheyenne Indians team.

After 1912, Dawson did not host another minor league team. When the local coal mines closed in the 1950s, Dawson had no remaining industry and became a ghost town. After the residents left the city, the hospital, school, stores, churches, and homes were destroyed and bulldozed into the mined area, which was covered with dirt.

The ballpark
The exact name of the Dawson Stags' home ballpark is not unknown.

Timeline

Year–by–year records

Notable alumni
Roster information for the 1912 Colorado Springs/Dawson team is unknown.

See also
List of ghost towns in New Mexico

References

External links
Baseball Reference

Defunct baseball teams in New Mexico
Baseball teams disestablished in 1912
Baseball teams established in 1912
Colfax County, New Mexico
1912 establishments in New Mexico
1912 disestablishments in New Mexico
Rocky Mountain League teams